Toholji is a village in the municipality of Foča, Republika Srpska, Bosnia and Herzegovina.

References

Populated places in Foča